3,4-Methylenedioxy-N-propylamphetamine (MDPR, "Phantom") is a lesser-known psychedelic drug and a substituted amphetamine. MDPR was first synthesized by Alexander Shulgin. In his book PiHKAL, the minimum dosage is listed as 200 mg, and the duration unknown. MDPR is a promoter; by itself it has almost no effects on the mind, but it promotes the effects of hallucinogens, similarly to the closely related MDPH.

Shulgin reported that 160 mg of MDPR strongly enhanced the effects of a small (60 μg) dose of LSD, and that similar enhancement of hallucinogenic effect was noted when mixing MDPR with other drugs such as psilocybin, mescaline, 2C-B, and 2C-T-7. The reason for this synergistic action of MDPR has not been elucidated. Very little data exists about the pharmacological properties, metabolism, and toxicity of MDPR other than what is written in PiHKAL.

See also 
 Phenethylamine
 MDAL
 Psychedelic drug

References 

Benzodioxoles
Psychedelic drugs
Substituted amphetamines